Napa Valley 1839 FC is a men's and women’s soccer club based in Napa, California. The men compete in the NPSL  Golden Gate Conference. The women compete in the Women’s Premier Soccer League. The club's colors are green and white.

History
Napa Valley 1839 FC was founded in 2016 by Josh Goss, Arik Housley, Jonathan Collura, and Michael Hitchcock, joining NPSL's Golden Gate Conference as an expansion team.  The team is affiliated with Napa United, a youth organization.

Players and staff

Current roster

Coaching staff
 Rogelio Ochoa, Head Coach
 Ivan Hernandez, Assistant Coach

Front office
 Josh Goss – co-owner
 Arik Housley – co-owner
 Jonathan Collura – co-owner
 Michael Hitchcock – co-owner
 Chris Salese – co-owner
 Josh Goss – General Manager
 Peter Weber – Marketing Director

Record

Year-by-year

Tournament results
2019 NPSL Members Cup: 6th, 1-1-8 (4 pts)

Honors
Wine Country Derby champion (1): 2019

References

External links

2016 establishments in California
Association football clubs established in 2016
Soccer clubs in the San Francisco Bay Area
National Premier Soccer League teams
Napa County, California